The Major and the Bulls (German: Der Major und die Stiere) is a 1955 West German comedy film directed by Eduard von Borsody and starring Fritz Tillmann, Christiane Hörbiger and  Attila Hörbiger. It is based on the 1953 novel of the same title by Hans Venatier. It was shot at the Bavaria Studios in Munich and in Wiesbaden. The film's sets were designed by the art director Ernst Schomer.

Synopsis
Following the Second World War, Allied forces arrive to occupy Germany. In Bavaria in the American Zone, an army major tries to prevent fraternising between his troops and the locals. This quickly breaks down as several romantic relationships begin between local girls and the G.I.s while the obstinate peasants eventually overcome their dislike of being ordered about by the military.

Cast
 Fritz Tillmann as 	Major William Sunlet
 Christiane Hörbiger as 	Marie
 Attila Hörbiger as Koltnerbauer
 Hans von Borsody as 	George
 Eva Probst as 	Mrs. Wendlandt
 Chris Howland as 	Sergeant Bobby
 Olga von Togni as 	Koltnerbäuerin
 Maria Hofen as 	Stockbäuerin
 Carsta Löck as 	Hebamme
 Katharina Brauren as 	Riedbäuerin
 Nora Minor as 	Säusepp-Bäuerin
 Hans Stadtmüller as Aigner
 Reinhold Siegert as 	Krotthefner
 Heinz Laube as 	Riedbauer
 Konrad Mayerhoff as 	Fengerl
 Karl Meixner as 	Säusepp-Bauer
 Alfred Menhardt as 	Zand
 Klaus Pohl as 	Stockbauer
 Ulrich Beiger as 	CIC-Leutnant Houseman
 Alexander Golling as 	Landrat Spiegel
 Kurt Hepperlin as 	Luck
 Ingrid Lutz as 	Sigrid

References

Bibliography 
 Fehrenbach, Heide. Cinema in Democratizing Germany: Reconstructing National Identity After Hitler. University of North Carolina Press, 2000.

External links 
 

1955 films
West German films
German comedy films
1955 comedy films
1950s German-language films
Films directed by Eduard von Borsody
Films shot at Bavaria Studios
Films set in Bavaria
Films set in 1945
Films based on German novels
German black-and-white films
1950s German films